Ariamnes uwepa is a species of spider from the family Theridiidae.  It is only known to be found on Oahu, in the Hawaiian Islands.  The name derives from the Hawaiian word "uwepa," meaning whip.

Description
Living specimens have a bright gold abdomen, sometimes with red.

Range and habitat
Very little is known about the range.  Specimens have been collected from mesic habitat, often found under leaves.  Species has been exclusively found on Oahu.

References

Theridiidae
Spiders of Hawaii
Spiders described in 2007